Batrachorhina vagepicta is a species of beetle in the family Cerambycidae. It was described by Léon Fairmaire in 1901, originally under the genus Coedomea. It is known from Madagascar.

References

Batrachorhina
Beetles described in 1901